The Toyota Finance 86 Championship was a brand new One-make racing series in New Zealand, made up of race ready Toyota 86 cars. The series ran across six rounds throughout the New Zealand summer, after the seventh round – a scheduled three-hour endurance race at Pukekohe Park Raceway – was cancelled.

The series was organised and run by the same people that run the popular Toyota Racing Series each summer, and the new one-make series featured past drivers of the Toyota Racing Series. One of these drivers, Jamie McNee, became the inaugural champion at the end of the series.

Teams and Drivers

Race calendar and results
All rounds were held in New Zealand. Rounds 3 and 4 were held with the Toyota Racing Series. The original final round, that was scheduled for Pukekohe Park Raceway on 17 and 18 May, was later removed from the calendar.

Championship standings

In order for a driver to score championship points, they had to complete at least 90% of the race winner's distance. All races counted towards the final championship standings.

Scoring system

References

External links
 

Toyota Finance 86 Championship
Toyota Finance 86 Championship
Toyota Finance 86 Championship